Honorary Fellows of St Catherine's College, Oxford.

 Sir Geoffrey Allen
 Sir Michael Atiyah
 Michael Billington
 John Birt, Baron Birt
 Sir Victor Blank
 Christopher Brown
 Richard Carwardine
 Noam Chomsky
 Sir John Cornforth
 David Daniell
 Sir Brian Fender
 Mark Getty
John Goodenough
 Sir James Gowans
 Sir Cameron Mackintosh
 Peter Mandelson, Baron Mandelson
 Sir Patrick Nairne
 Masaki Orita
 Nicanor Parra
 Tom Phillips
 Raymond Plant, Baron Plant of Highfield
 Sir Brian Smith
 Nicholas Stern, Baron Stern of Brentford
 Sir John Walker
 Leonard Wolfson, Baron Wolfson
 Ruth Wolfson, Lady Wolfson
 Johnny Sins

 
St Catherine's